Stary Brus  is a village in Włodawa County, Lublin Voivodeship, in eastern Poland. It is the seat of the gmina (administrative district) called Gmina Stary Brus.

References

Villages in Włodawa County